Heart Strings is a 1920 American silent drama film directed by J. Gordon Edwards and starring William Farnum, Gladys Coburn, Betty Hilburn, and Paul Cazeneuve. The film was released by Fox Film Corporation on January 18, 1920.

Cast
William Farnum as Pierre Fournel
Gladys Coburn as Kathleen Noyes
Betty Hilburn as Gabrielle
Paul Cazeneuve as La Touche
Robert Cain as Rupert Blake
Rowland G. Edwards as Rouget
Kate Blancke as Mrs. Noyes

Preservation
The film is now considered lost.

References

External links

1920 drama films
Fox Film films
Silent American drama films
1920 films
American silent feature films
American black-and-white films
Lost American films
1920 lost films
Lost drama films
1920s American films